Germaine Richier (16 September 1902 – 21 July 1959) was a French sculptor.

Born in Grans, Richier began her studies at the Ecole des Beaux Arts in Montpellier, in the atelier of Louis-Jacques Guigues; in 1926 she went to work with Antoine Bourdelle, remaining in his studio until his death in 1929. There she became acquainted with Alberto Giacometti, although the two were never close. Richier for her part was more interested in a classical approach to sculpture, preferring to work from a live model and then reworking the final product. She also met César Baldaccini at this stage in her career. She married Otto Bänninger on 12 December 1929. In 1936, she won the Prix Blumenthal. During the war, she met Marino Marini, in exile in Switzerland.

Career
Richier's early work was fantastic, combining classical forms with human-animal hybrids and depicting creatures such as the spider and the hydra. Her style became less figurative after World War II; the bodily deformations which she favoured as subjects were more accentuated in an attempt to convey a greater sense of anguish.

Controversy
The greatest controversy surrounding Richier's work came about with her creation of a statue of Christ for the church of Notre-Dame de Toute Grâce du Plateau d'Assy. Meant to depict the physical and spiritual torment of Christ, she explained that: the cross has been taken with the suffering into the flesh, and its outlines can just be made out coming from the undersides of the arms. There is no face because God is the spirit and faceless.... The sculpture was ordered removed from sight by the bishop of Annecy. This event was the catalyst for a great argument about the nature and role of sacred art which took place throughout the 1950s, during which many artists found themselves opposed to the traditional role of religious and academic art. Some have also described the controversy as a debate over the nature of God in modern society.

Richier, for her part, gained some notoriety from the entire business, but seemed to retreat into obscurity again before her death in 1959.

Retrospectives
Retrospectives of her work were held at the Peggy Guggenheim Collection, and the Fondation Maeght in Saint-Paul, Alpes-Maritimes.
Her works are in the Tuileries Garden, Musée Fabre, and the  Tate Collection.
Richier was celebrated on a postage stamp issued by La Poste in 1993 as part of a commemorative series depicting artists.

Further reading 
 Jean Cassou, Germaine Richier, Éditions du Temps, Paris, 1961.
 Valérie Da Costa, Germaine Richier, un art entre deux mondes, 2006, Norma Éditions, Paris, .
 Céline Frémaux, L'Architecture religieuse au xxe siècle, Presses Universitaires de Rennes, Rennes, 2007, p. 71 et 75.
Uta Grosenick, Women artists. Femmes artistes du xxe et xxie siècle, Taschen, Köln, 2001, p. 444 à 449.
André Pieyre de Mandiargues, Germaine Richier, Éditions Synthèses, Bruxelles, 1959.
Jean-Louis Prat, Germaine Richier, rétrospective, Saint-Paul-de-Vence, Fondation Maeght, 1996, 240 p., rétrospective du 5 avril au 18 juin 1996
Jean-Louis Ferrier, Yann Le Pichon, L'Aventure de l'art au xxe siècle, Paris, Éditions du Chêne-Hachette, 1988, 898 p.- préface de Pontus Hultén
Michel Seuphor, La sculpture de ce siecle, Neuchatel, Éditions du Griffon, 1959, 372 p. (OCLC 299858139)

References

External links
"Encounter With Germaine Richier", Paul Guth and Neil Chapman, Yale French Studies, No. 19/20, Contemporary Art (1957), pp. 78–84
"CHRIST D'ASSY I", Sotheby's, 13 December 2006
 

1902 births
1959 deaths
Prix Blumenthal
20th-century French sculptors
20th-century French women artists
French women sculptors